Basher Kill is a stream in Orange and Sullivan counties in the U.S. state of New York. It is a tributary to the Neversink River.

The stream flows to the southwest paralleling U.S. Route 209 passing under New York Route 17 southeast of Wurtsboro. The stream enters Orange County at the village of Westbrookville. The confluence is just northeast of the community of Myers Grove.

Basher Kill was named after , a local Native American woman. Many variant spellings have been recorded, including "Ba-sha Kill", "Basha's Kill", "Basher's Kill", "Bashers Kil", Bashers Kill", and "Bashes Kil".

The stream flows through Basha Kill Wildlife Management Area, a manmade wetland maintained by the New York State Department of Environmental Conservation (NYSDEC) as a New York State Wildlife Management Area. The NYSDEC built a dam along the watercourse in the 1970s to preserve the Basha Kill and its wildlife.

References

Rivers of Orange County, New York
Rivers of Sullivan County, New York